James Butler (1680 – 17 May 1741), was a British politician who sat in the House of Commons at various times between 1705 and 1741.

Butler was the son of James Butler of Amberley Castle and his wife Grace Caldecott, daughter of Richard Caldecott of Hawkhurst, Kent. His father, who had been MP for Arundel died in 1696. He was probably admitted at Trinity Hall, Cambridge in 1698. He married Elizabeth Bennet, widow of Sir Richard Bennet, 3rd Baronet and daughter of Sir Charles Caesar of Bennington, Hertfordshire on 31 January 1704.  He bought the estate of Warminghurst in 1792 or 1707, from William Penn.

A Whig supporter, he  was returned as Member of Parliament for Arundel at the 1705 general election but did not stand in 1708. He was elected MP for Sussex at the 1715 general election but did not stand in 1722. However he was returned as MP for Sussex at a by-election on 22 February 1728 and retained the seat at the elections of 1734 and 1741.

Butler died of smallpox aged 61 on 17 May 1741, ten days after his re-election. His only son John was also an MP.

References

External links
http://www.nationalarchives.gov.uk/a2a/records.aspx?cat=182-clough&cid=0#0

1680 births
1741 deaths
People from Amberley, West Sussex
Place of birth missing
English MPs 1705–1707
Members of the Parliament of Great Britain for English constituencies
British MPs 1707–1708
British MPs 1715–1722